Escobar: El Patrón del Mal (international title: Pablo Escobar, The Drug Lord; also known as Pablo Escobar: El Patrón del Mal) is a 2012 Colombian telenovela produced and broadcast on Caracol TV, based on a true story about the life of Pablo Escobar – the notorious druglord. It is available only in Spanish. There is a version available with English dubbed, as well as a version dubbed in Hindi on the ZEE5 app. It also aired in Arabic dub on Lana TV. It is also available in version dubbed in Turkish on Netflix.

History
From May 28 to November 1, 2012, Caracol TV aired Escobar: El Patrón del Mal weeknights at 9:30pm. From July 9 to July 27, 2012, Telemundo aired one-hour episodes of Pablo Escobar weeknights at 10pm/9c, replacing Decisiones Extremas. From July 30, 2012 to January 24, 2013, Telemundo aired half-hour episodes of Pablo Escobar and El Rostro de la Venganza weeknights, both sharing the 10pm time slot. From January 25 onwards, one-hour episodes of El Rostro de la Venganza were broadcast.

Plot
The series begins and ends with his dramatic last moments before being shot to death by agents of the Colombian National Police, while escaping from a relative's home, and later flashing back to his childhood in Valle de Aburra, Colombia, where Pablo is teased by his cousin, Gonzalo, and older brother, Peluche, on a footbridge crossing a creek, eventually rescued by his mother, who scolds Pablo for crying. His mother's influence on Escobar's life choices is portrayed in the first episode and throughout the series, starting with her admonishment that if he is going to do something bad, he had better do it really well, after he is frustrated while trying to cheat on a test and starting a class rebellion to avoid the consequences. As he and Gonzalo became older, they began their lives of organised crime, becoming bodyguards to a well known smuggler and eventually his partners, after successfully standing off with police in what would become Escobar's trademark "Plata o Plomo" approach to dealing with law enforcement -- "accept our bribe or prepare for a shootout with us." After robbing a bank and being turned in by one of their neighbors, Pablo and his cousin start their careers as murderers by killing him. Thereafter, the series follows Pablo's adventures and misadventures in organized crime and eventually cocaine smuggling, building an empire of wealthy criminals who contest power, often violently, with the Colombian state, eventually leading to murders of prominent politicians, policemen, business associates, friends, lovers, and eventually common citizens. The plot focuses on Escobar's contradictory drives to be a good husband; a decent, upstanding, Colombian citizen; a politician; a supporter of the poor; and a wealthy, powerful "bandido" (an endearing term for criminal, like "rascal"), all while seeking ever more political power, wealth, and sexual exploits.

Cast 
For the broadcast of the series, Caracol decided to change the real names of the characters and their aliases, although some resemblance was maintained between the physique of the characters and their aliases with the real people they played.
The following tables show the names of the characters and actors, as well as the names of the real-life people they represent in the series.

Pablo Escobar and his Family

Important members of the Medellín Cartel

Group of hitmen

Cali Cartel and Self-Defense Forces (PEPES)

Members of the public force, judges and family members

Government and press members

Left leaders and other characters

Colombia broadcast 
 Release dates and episode names, based on Colombia's Caracol TV broadcast.

Production 
The series was created by Camilo Cano and Juana Uribe, vice president of Caracol TV and the series' producer. Cano's father, Guillermo Cano, who was publisher of newspaper El Espectador, was murdered by Escobar in December 1986. Uribe's mother, Maruja Pachón, was kidnapped on Escobar's orders, and her uncle, presidential candidate Luis Carlos Galán, was killed on Escobar's orders in August 1989.

According to Caracol TV, the series features 1,300 actors and more than 450 locations; each episode cost COP 300 million (€131,000, £105,000 or US$164,000).

Reception 
After heavy promotion on Caracol TV and in El Espectador, Escobar premiered with high ratings. However, some people have criticized the show, wondering if the audience will eventually identify with the drug lord instead of the people who fought him. A researcher, prior to the release of the show, opined to  Medellín newspaper El Colombiano that the series will not add anything to TV "because its treatment is not a documentary" and it does not address "rigorous academic research. The model is fiction and the victims' participation won't be anything more than an anecdote. On the contrary, this kind of series eventually distorts knowledge about history in public opinion."

Telemundo's July 9 broadcast of Pablo Escobar: El Patrón del Mal averaged nearly 2.2 million viewers.

Awards 
Confirmed on June 27, 2013. The finalists were announced on July 31, 2013. Winners were announced on August 15, 2013.
Premios tu mundo 2013

See also 
 El Señor de los Cielos
 Narcos (2015)

References

External links 
 
 
 Telemundo Now, Telemundo Full Episodes

2012 telenovelas
2012 Colombian television series debuts
2012 Colombian television series endings
Caracol Televisión telenovelas
Docudrama television series
Films about Pablo Escobar
Cultural depictions of Pablo Escobar
Spanish-language telenovelas
Television shows set in Colombia
Works about Colombian drug cartels